Kurukaymak is a village in the Hozat District, Tunceli Province, Turkey. The village is populated by Kurds of the Qoçan tribe and had a population of 6 in 2022. No population was registered in the village between 2007 and 2021.

The hamlets of Doğyurdu, Kapıkaya, Yanıktaş and Yeşerti are attached to the village.

References 

Kurdish settlements in Tunceli Province
Villages in Hozat District